John Lindsay (born 2 April 1957) is a New Zealand former cricketer. He played 44 first-class matches for Otago between 1980 and 1992.

See also
 List of Otago representative cricketers

References

External links
 

1957 births
Living people
New Zealand cricketers
Otago cricketers
People from Winton, New Zealand